Antineosteus is an extinct genus of homostiid arthrodire from the Emsian, Early Devonian Kess-Kess Mounds, in the eastern Anti-Atlas Mountains, Morocco, and the Barrandian area of the Czech Republic.

Description 
Antineosteus lehmani is rather fragmentary, known from a left anterior dorsolateral plate, a left paranuchal plate, and an inferognathal.

A. rufus is known from a nearly-complete right head shield plate, and a right anterior dorsolateral plate.

A. rufus is estimated to exceed , from measuring the plates with the ones from better-preserved, related taxa.

Diet 
Antineosteus, like many other members of Homostiidae, lacked bladed dentition on their jaws, and was large in size. These traits all in one animal support a planktivorous lifestyle, like baleen whales, or the whale shark, as supported by Denison, 1978, suggesting similar lifestyles for arthrodires like Homostius, making it reasonable for many homostiids to be suspension-feeders like the later Titanichthys.

Phylogeny 
Antineosteus is a homostiid, closest related to Homostius.

Taxonomy shown here is based on "FISH FROM THE EMSIAN OF ARAGÓN".

References 

Homostiidae
Arthrodire genera
Placoderms of Africa
Placoderms of Europe